The Cambridge Turbos is a ringette team in Canada's National Ringette League (NRL) competing in the Eastern Conference in the Red division. Founded in 2003, the is team based in Cambridge, Ontario. The Turbos home arena is the Hespeler Memorial Arena, a facility which is a twin sheet arena with two Olympic Sized sheets of ice (200'x100'). The team did not compete in the NRL Championships during the Covid-19 pandemic.

The team acquired its name from a curious, exuberant, long-haired Syrian hamster, ( "teddy bear hamster") owned by former Turbos player, Corina Harris. While there are no remaining photos of Turbo the Hamster, his memory has been immortalized.

In the past the Turbos also competed against Bourassa Royal before that NRL team was discontinued.

History

National Ringette League 
The Cambridge Turbos have played in the National Ringette League since its formation in 2003–04. The team won the National Ringette League championship in 2005–06, 2007–08, 2008–09, 2014–15, 2015–16 and 2016–17.

The NRL and the Cambridge Turbos were featured in an episode of Canada's 'Rick Mercer Report' in 2009 called "Ringette Night In Canada".

League competition 2022–23 season

In 2022–23, the NRL entered its 18th season with thirteen teams competing:

Western Conference
 BC Thunder
 Edmonton Black Gold Rush
 Edmonton WAM!
 Calgary RATH
 Saskatchewan Heat
 Manitoba Herd

Eastern Conference Red
 Nepean Ravens
 Waterloo Wildfire
 Gatineau Fusion
 Cambridge Turbos

Eastern Conference White
 Montreal Mission
 Rive-Sud Révolution
 Atlantic Attack

Regular season records

Team

2022–23 Season Roster 

The Cambridge Turbos compete in the 2022–23 NRL season.

2013–14 Season Roster

All-time record

Ringette World Club Championship 
In November 2008, the Turbos won the first Ringette World Club Championship which gathered six teams from around the world. The Turbos won the world title with a 5–2 victory in the final against the Finnish club  (LuKi-82).

See also

 Ringette
 National Ringette League
 Montreal Mission
 Atlantic Attack
 Bourassa Royal
 Calgary RATH
 Rive-Sud Révolution

References

External links
 Ringette Canada
 National Ringette League Website
 Ontario Ringette Association
 Cambridge Ringette Association
 Cambridge Turbos Twitter

National Ringette League
NRL
Ringette
Ringette players
Women's sports teams
Women's sports teams in Canada
Sport in Cambridge, Ontario
Sports teams in Ontario
2003 establishments in Ontario
Sports clubs established in 2003